Posan station is a freight-only railway station in Posan-dong, Ch'ŏllima-guyŏk, Namp'o Special City, North Korea. It is the terminus of the Posan Line from Kangsŏ on the P'yŏngnam Line of the Korean State Railway.

Services
The primary function of this station is to provide rail service, via several sidings, to the April 13 Ironworks, which produces pig iron; all of the output is shipped to the Ch'ŏllima Steel Complex a short distance away at Kangsŏn on the P'yŏngnam Line, whilst using raw materials received from all over the western part of the country.

References

Railway stations in North Korea
Buildings and structures in Nampo